Hostile architecture is an urban-design strategy that uses elements of the built environment to purposefully guide or restrict behaviour. It often targets people who use or rely on public space more than others, such as youth, poor people, and homeless people, by restricting the physical behaviours they can engage in.

Also known as defensive architecture, hostile design, unpleasant design, exclusionary design, and defensive urban design, the term hostile architecture is often associated with items like "anti-homeless spikes" – studs embedded in flat surfaces to make sleeping on them uncomfortable and impractical. This form of architecture is most commonly found in densely populated and urban areas. Other measures include sloped window sills to stop people sitting; benches with armrests positioned to stop people lying on them; water sprinklers that spray intermittently; and public trash bins with inconveniently small mouths to prevent the insertion of bulky wastes. Hostile architecture is also employed to deter skateboarding, BMXing, inline skating, littering, loitering, public urination, and trespassing, and as a form of pest control.

Background
Although the term "hostile architecture" is recent, the use of civil engineering to achieve social engineering is not: antecedents include 19th century urine deflectors and urban planning in the United States designed for segregation. American urban planner Robert Moses designed a stretch of Long Island Southern State Parkway with low stone bridges so that buses could not pass under them. This made it more difficult for people who relied on public transportation, mainly African Americans, to visit the beach that wealthier car-owners could visit. Outside of the United States, public space design change for the purpose of social control also has historic precedent: the narrow streets of 19th century Paris, France were made wider for the purpose of allowing the military easier ability to quash protests.

Its modern form is derived from the design philosophy Crime Prevention through Environmental Design (CPTED), which aims to prevent crime or protect property through three strategies: natural surveillance, natural access control, and territorial enforcement. According to experts, exclusionary design is becoming increasingly common, not least in large cities such as Stockholm.

Consistent with the widespread implementation of defensible space guidelines in the 1970s, most implementations of CPTED as of 2004 were based solely upon the theory that the proper design and effective use of the built environment could reduce crime, reduce fear of crime, and improve quality of life. Built environment implementations of CPTED seek to dissuade offenders from committing crimes by manipulating the built environment in which those crimes proceed or occur. The six main concepts according to Moffat are territoriality, surveillance, access control, image/maintenance, activity support and target hardening. Applying all of these strategies is key when trying to prevent crime in any neighborhood, crime-ridden or not.

Beyond CPTED, scholarly research has also found that modern capitalist cities have a vested interest in eliminating signs of homelessness from their communal spaces, fearing that it might discourage investment from wealthier individuals and highlight the shortcomings of their economic model. In England, much of their hostile architecture has been attributed to a desire by the government to combat an anti-social street scene, taking the form of begging and street drinking.

Identifying hostile architecture 
Some forms of hostile architecture are easily recognized, while others could be interpreted as either exclusionary or non-exclusionary, such as spaced-out singular chairs constructed at a playground in Sweden, which may appear intentionally designed to dissuade homeless sleeping, or as an acknowledgement that Swedes consider it impolite to sit near strangers.  Some researchers have said that hostile architecture should be evaluated within the wider context of the community, and should recognize the social and political forces motivating a particular design choice, such as anti-homelessness legislation or sentiments.

Applications

Camping deterrents 
In Seattle, Washington, United States, the city government installed bicycle racks to prevent homeless people from camping.

Since 2013, the Oregon Department of Transportation in Oregon, United States deployed large boulders at eight locations that had been the site of transient camps in Portland. These boulders were installed to deter illegal camping near the freeways.

Fences or grates 

Fences or grates are a common form of exclusionary design, often used to prevent access to places where there is protection from the elements, for example under stairs, bridges, or near fan systems that blow out hot air.

In the spring of 2015, the City of Stockholm, Sweden, erected a  fence to prevent homeless people from seeking shelter under a staircase in Kungsholmen.

Sleeping deterrents 
In many large cities, for example Tokyo and London, benches have been designed to prevent people from sleeping on them.  These benches have been constructed so that the seat slopes at an angle, which requires the user to support themselves entirely with their feet; such benches are ubiquitous on bus stops across the United Kingdom. Another deterrent design is to include armrests placed down the center of the bench, preventing the user from laying down across the seats.

Camden Borough Council in London commissioned concrete-block benches (dubbed "Camden benches") designed to discourage uses such as sleeping, skateboarding and placing stickers. There are other variants, in which level differences are absent but they tend to be either too short to lie on, or have iron pipes placed two-thirds of the way in, or multiple armrests placed along the entire length of the bench. Such benches are common in airports.

When the City Tunnel in Malmö, Sweden, was opened in 2010, the design of the benches on the new train platforms was reported to the Equality Ombudsman because the benches were tilted so much that they were difficult to impossible to use for sitting. The Swedish state-owned real estate company Jernhusen has also used so-called "homeless-proof" benches at the train station in Luleå, with seven iron bars at  intervals per bench. Jernhusen's press officer maintained that they "put in the armrests primarily to make it easier for the elderly and disabled to sit and stand up" but admitted in an interview that the perceived orderliness problems at the station building influenced how the benches were designed. Another example of a company that has installed such benches is Berliner Verkehrsbetriebe, Berlin's local public transport company.

Some examples of sleeping deterrents take the form of temporary changes to buildings.  An example of this occurred in a Liverpool building, previously the Bank of England headquarters, in December 2016.  A blue sloping steel structure covered in oil was placed over the stairs at night, so that the homeless who used to sleep and rest on the stairs would not stay there.

Spikes 
They can occur as spikes, bumps or other types of pointed structures. They are typically placed on ledges outside buildings, under roofs or other places where people seek rest or shelter, and also around shops. The property management company Jernhusen uses a variant by placing pipes instead of spikes in several places at Stockholm Central Station. In 2014, images circulated on the internet of a place in London where homeless people used to sleep. The ground had been fitted with sharp upward-pointing spikes to get rid of people who used to sleep there, but after widespread protests, the anti-homeless spikes were removed. There are also anti-homeless spikes which are intended to ensure that people do not, for example, sit against a house wall, or stand in a particular place. It is difficult to adequately assess how many different types exist, but it is certain that there are many types of the phenomenon, including split bricks which form cracks, various forms of bent metal pipes, and plates welded upwards to form spikes. Former UK Prime Minister Boris Johnson has called the spikes "stupid".

Security cameras 
One of the most common forms of hostile architecture takes the form of surveillance. Indeed, while security cameras do not physically prevent people from engaging in certain behaviors, they can restrict actions in public spaces through enabling remote oversight and increasing the fear of retaliation for socially taboo actions. In cities like Cincinnati, there has been a noted sharp increase in the number of CCTV cameras in public spaces since the 1990s.

Urination deterrent

Hostile architecture as art or embellishment 

This type of exclusionary design may involve, for example, displaying a large flowerpot where homeless people previously used the pavement to sleep. Other examples that have occurred include a stone painted in rainbow colours, putting out blocking shrubbery on a sidewalk, and "fun" shaped seating.

Music and noise 
In Sweden, loudspeakers in Finspång have played music in order to get addicts to leave certain places. In the UK and Germany, so-called anti-loitering devices (see The Mosquito) have been installed to ensure that young people do not stay in places where they are installed. The devices work by emitting a monotone sound at such a high frequency that most people after adolescence lose the ability to hear it. Critics have stated that the devices constitute a violation of human rights and also comment that the phenomenon would create a "dangerous gap" between young people exposed to it and older people who can avoid it. In Germany, classical music has been used in an attempt to keep drug users away. In Berlin, a plan to use atonal music at S-Bahn stations has been withdrawn after criticism.

Removal 
Sometimes exclusionary design is not about adding features, but rather about taking them away. Fredrik Edin, who has written a book on exclusionary design, says that removal is the most common type of exclusionary design, where, for example, benches used by the public are removed precisely because they are used by the public. One example is when representatives of the New York City Subway announced via social media in 2021 that "benches were removed from stations to prevent the homeless from sleeping on them." The agency later said the tweet was a mistake. Benches at certain locations at Stockholm Central Station were removed in 2015 in favour of chairs and benches were also removed at Luleå railway station. Their press officer stated that they had problems with the station being used as a warming shelter. Many public toilets have begun to be removed in the UK in places considered to be untidy.

Sprinklers 
Sprinklers can be found in areas where spikes are considered too permanent; this solution involves spraying water on those staying in a particular place at a particular time. In New Zealand, Auckland City Councillor Cathy Casey described sprinklers being used by businesses in the city as "inhumane".

The Strand Bookstore in New York used such a system in 2013 to deter homeless people sleeping outside the store at night. Bonhams in San Francisco was criticised for an external sprinkler system that it claimed was used to clean "building and perimeter sidewalks during non-business hours intermittently over a 48-hour period", and which was also a point where homeless people gathered.

Public reception  
Opposition to hostile architecture in urban design states that such architecture makes public spaces hostile to all people and especially targets the transient and homeless populations.
Proponents say that clearly establishing a sense of ownership over the space helps maintain order and safety and deter crime and unwanted behaviors.

In 2018, British artist Stuart Semple created a social media public awareness campaign encouraging the public to place identifying stickers on instances of hostile design in their environment.

Examples of hostile architecture circulating within UK media have led to negative reception. The Joseph Rowntree Foundation warned that homelessness in London is rising significantly faster than the nationwide average. Nonetheless, types of hostile architecture have increased. For example, Selfridges in Manchester installed metal spikes outside their store for the purpose of reducing "litter and smoking," which suggests hostile architecture may be implicated for one reason but explained by another.

Artistic response 
 In 2001, Nils Norman published the book The Contemporary Picturesque, which contains photographs he has taken of exclusionary design since the 1990s.
 In 2003, two Parisians, Stéphane Argillet and Gilles Paté, filmed the film  (The Fakir's Rest), which shows them attempting to rest on various objects that characterize exclusionary design in Paris.
 In 2005, American artist and researcher Sarah Ross documented exclusionary design in Los Angeles in her series Tempting Resistance. Her 2006 follow-up, Archisuits, created clothing that was designed to work with exclusionary design – to make sleep possible.
 In 2013–2014, an installation in Norrköping, Sweden, called "Modified Social Benches" by Danish artist Jeppe Hein took place.
 In 2015, artist and architect Johanna Nenander drew attention to the phenomenon through her project "Urbana proteser", in which she placed seating that was deliberately positioned to make it difficult to sit down on. For a few days, a pair of sheet-metal foundations on the slab, which were impossible to sit on, became a bench for the public.
 In 2018, British artist and exhibition curator Stuart Semple created a social media platform to encourage the public to place identifying stickers where they spotted exclusionary designs in public spaces.

Impacts of hostile architecture 
Making the built environment hostile to undesirable people, such as skateboarders or people without stable housing, also has the effect of making it hostile to elderly people, people with disabilities, tired workers, pregnant women, people caring for young children, and other desirable people.

Up to this point, there has not been a wide scale empirical study that has measured the impact of hostile architecture on the wellbeing of homeless people or other targeted populations. Some members of England's homeless community interviewed by researchers have noted that hostile design contributes to their displacement and feelings of insignificance, as it appears that local business interests are prioritized over their survival.

Designing infrastructure to be exclusionary encourages those experiencing homelessness to seek out homeless shelters, which are comparably safer and more comfortable than general public spaces.

Gallery

See also 
 Architecture terrible
 Bird control spike
 Defensible space theory
 Defensive design
 Functionalism (architecture)
 Privately owned public space
 New Urbanism
 Urban vitality

References

External links 

 Cara Chellew, Bars, barriers and ghost amenities: Defensive urban design in Toronto Torontoist. 
 Lloyd Alter, Hostile design doesn't work for any age group Mother Nature Network. 
 Cara Chellew, Defensive Inequalities Spacing Magazine. 
 
 HostileDesign.org, Project homepage of Stuart Semple sticker campaign.

Class discrimination
Discrimination against the homeless
Homelessness
Skateboarding
Social engineering (political science)
Urban design